

The Piaggio P.9 was an Italian single-engined strut-braced high-wing cabin monoplane, designed and built by Piaggio as a tourer for the civil market. The wood-built two-seat P.9 was first flown in 1929, powered by a  Blackburn Cirrus II piston engine.

Specifications

References

Notes

Bibliography

1920s Italian civil utility aircraft
P.009
Aircraft first flown in 1929